GB Markhors was a Pakistani franchise cricket team that was expected to compete in the Kashmir Premier League. It was founded in 2022 for the second edition of Kashmir Premier League. The franchise was owned by Jahanzeb Alam. The franchise was expected to represent Gilgit-Baltistan, a region administrated by Pakistan. The team was removed from the 2022 KPL for unknown reasons.

References

Kashmir Premier League (Pakistan)
Cricket teams in Pakistan